A four-minute mile is the completion of a mile run (1.6 km) in four minutes or less.

Four Minute Mile may also refer to:
 4 Minute Mile, a 2014 American drama film
 Four Minute Mile, a 1997 album by American rock band The Get Up Kids
 The Four Minute Mile, a 1988 Australian miniseries